Emma Iwebunor Ania  is a former track and field sprint athlete who competed internationally for Great Britain.

Ania represented Great Britain at the 2008 Summer Olympics in Beijing. She competed at the 4×100 metres relay together with Jeanette Kwakye, Montell Douglas and Emily Freeman. In their first round heat they placed second behind Belgium and in front of Brazil and Nigeria. Their time of 43.02 seconds was the fourth time overall out of sixteen participating nations. With this result they qualified for the final in which they did not finish due to a mistake in the baton exchange.

Ania attended St Thomas More School, Wood Green and studied biology at Brunel University.

References

External links

1980 births
Living people
English female sprinters
Olympic athletes of Great Britain
Athletes (track and field) at the 2008 Summer Olympics
People from Wood Green
Alumni of Brunel University London
Black British sportswomen
European Athletics Championships medalists
Athletes (track and field) at the 2006 Commonwealth Games
Commonwealth Games medallists in athletics
Commonwealth Games silver medallists for England
Olympic female sprinters
Medallists at the 2006 Commonwealth Games